Oakland may refer to:
Oakland, Henrico County, Virginia

Oakland, Louisa County, Virginia
Oakland, Pittsylvania County, Virginia
Oakland, Roanoke, Virginia
Oakland, Suffolk, Virginia
Oakland, Richmond County, Virginia, now known as Mulch